Riley Tanner Rintala (born 15 October 1999) is an US-born Panamanian footballer who plays as a forward for NWSL side Washington Spirit and the Panama women's national team.

Biography
Although Tanner was born in Grand Rapids, Michigan, she was eligible to play for Panama as her mother was born in Panama City. Tanner played college soccer at the University of Alabama, where she earned a Master of Public Health in 2022.

After graduating college, she was chosen in the third round of the 2023 NWSL Draft by Washington Spirit.

International career
On 26 January 2023, Tanner was announced as part of a 23-player Panama squad for the Women's World Cup inter-confederation play-offs. In the first play-off match against Papua New Guinea on 19 February, Tanner scored in the 63rd minute after coming off the bench to help Panama win 2–0.

International goals

References

External links
 South Carolina profile
 

1999 births
Living people
People from Kent County, Michigan
Sportspeople from Grand Rapids, Michigan
Soccer players from Michigan
American women's soccer players
American sportspeople of Panamanian descent
Panamanian women's footballers
Panamanian people of American descent
Sportspeople of American descent
Panama women's international footballers
People with acquired Panamanian citizenship
Alabama Crimson Tide women's soccer players
South Carolina Gamecocks women's soccer players
Washington Spirit draft picks
Washington Spirit players
Women's association football forwards